The 1882–83 Irish Cup was the third edition of the premier knock-out cup competition in Irish football. The competition ended on 5 May 1883 with the final.

Cliftonville won the tournament for the first time, defeating Ulster 5–0 in the final. The holders Queen's Island were eliminated in the semi-finals.

Results

First round

|}

Second round

|}

Replay

|}

1 After this match the decision was taken to grant both teams a bye into the third round.

Third round

|}

1 Alexander originally won the match 1-0 which was changed to 0-0 after a protest.
2 Queen's Island originally won the match 2-1 which was changed to 1-1 after a protest.

Replays

|}

Semi-finals

|}

Final

References

External links
 Northern Ireland Cup Finals. Rec.Sport.Soccer Statistics Foundation (RSSSF)

Irish Cup seasons
1882–83 domestic association football cups
1882–83 in Irish association football